Posio is a municipality of Finland.
It is located in the province of Lapland. The municipality has a population of 
which 
is water. The population density is
. Neighbour municipalities are Rovaniemi, Kemijärvi, Ranua, Salla, Kuusamo, Taivalkoski and Pudasjärvi.

The municipality has a single language, Finnish.

Major employers in Posio are the municipality itself, a major pottery manufacturer Pentik and agriculture (especially dairy farming).

The European route E63 runs through the northern-eastern parts of the municipality.

Korouoma canyon and natural reserve is located in Posio.

 north of the center of Posio is a microstate called , founded by Ari "Paska" Peltonen in 2006.

Sights and events
Posio's most renowned attractions are the Pentik-mäki Culture Centre, Riisitunturi National Park, Korouoma Nature Reserve, and the clear waters of lakes Kitkajärvi and Livojärvi. There are also many outdoor recreational things to do in Posio.

The world's northernmost ceramics factory is located in Posio. Pentik Oy interior design company was established in 1971 by Anu and Topi Pentikäinen.

Regular events in Posio are the Posio Fair, the amateur theatre event Teatterihelinät, and the Traditional Fish Fair Market (Muikkumarkkinat) in July.

Notable people
 Kaarlo Maaninka (born 1953), Finnish long distance runner
 Soile Isokoski (born 1957), Finnish lyric soprano

References

External links

Municipality of Posio – Official website 
Posio Tourism –  Official Website

 
Populated places established in 1926